Denis Vasilyevich Davydov (– ) was a Russian soldier-poet of the Napoleonic Wars who invented the genre of hussar poetry, characterised by hedonism and bravado. He used events from his own life to illustrate such poetry. He suggested and successfully pioneered guerrilla warfare in the Patriotic War of 1812 against Napoleon.

Biography
Davydov stemmed from a family of Russian nobility with Tatar roots. After gaining celebrity as a guerrilla leader in the French invasion of Russia he became one of the most popular men in the country. Young men of Pushkin's circle viewed him as a model romantic hero and the Decembrists prized his company as well.

He was high-spirited, healthy, virile, unromantic, and shallow. He was great wits and fond of fun, in life as well as in literature. His early and most popular verses are in a style of his own making, known as the “hussar style.” In them he sings the praise of reckless valor, on the field of battle as well as before the bottle. The diction in some is rather unconventional, and occasionally his words have to be replaced by dots, but it is always full of spirit and great rhythmical go. His later poems are inspired by a late love for a very young girl. They are passionately sentimental and as vivid and alive in diction and rhythmical. Alexander Pushkin had a high opinion of his poetry and said that Davydov had showed him the way to be original.

His poems were admired by Vissarion Belinsky for their organic quality and "Russianness".

Davydov fought in the Russo-Iranian War of 1826-1828.

His grave, with his statue above it, is situated next to the exit door of the Katholikon of the Novodevichy Convent.

Guerrilla warfare
During the French invasion of the Russian Empire Lieutenant-Colonel Davydov suggested to his general, Pyotr Bagration, the strategy of using a small force of at least 3,000 horsemen to attack the supply trains of Napoleon's invading Grande Armée. The Russian Commander-in-chief Mikhail Kutuzov (in office from ) agreed and gave an order for 200 to increase his attrition warfare against Napoleon. Davydov started with 135 horsemen as a separate command in the rear of the Grande Armée. They wore peasant clothes and beards to get the immediate support of the Russian people. They gave captured food and French weapons to the peasants and taught them how to fight a people's war. They captured French forage-expeditions, supply-trains with food, horses, weapons and ammunition, freed Russian prisoners and integrated them as volunteers with French horses, uniforms and weapons into their raiding party. These actions set off an avalanche of guerrilla warfare that became an important part of Kutuzov's attrition warfare.

In popular culture

A Boeing 777-300ER operated by Russia's national airline Aeroflot is named "D. Davydov" as part of a tradition in naming their fleet after historical Russian figures. The name is printed as part of the aircraft's nose art.

In the 20th and 21st century, at least 4 ships associated with the name of D. Davydov as an object of intangible heritage.

Notes

References

Further reading

External links

Poems 

Poets from the Russian Empire
Male writers from the Russian Empire
Imperial Russian Army generals
Commanders of the Napoleonic Wars from the Russian Empire
Military writers from the Russian Empire
Military humor
Memoirists from the Russian Empire
People of the November Uprising from the Russian Empire
People from the Russian Empire of Tatar descent
People of the Russo-Persian Wars
1784 births
1839 deaths
Burials at Novodevichy Cemetery
Russian Imperial Hussars officers
19th-century memoirists
Nobility from the Russian Empire